Josiah Turner (September 1, 1811 – April 7, 1907) was a Michigan pioneer and Supreme Court judge.

Turner was born in New Haven, Vermont on September 1, 1811. In 1831, Turner moved to St. Albans, Vermont, to read law with his uncle, Bates Turner, a former Vermont Supreme Court justice. In September 1833 he was admitted to the Vermont bar and then practiced law. In 1840, Turner and his wife moved to Howell, Michigan. Turner served as a Michigan circuit judge. In 1857, Turner was appointed to the Michigan Supreme Court. Turner was involved with the Republican Party. In 1860 Turner and his family to Owosso, Michigan. In April 1864 he was elected Mayor of Owosso. He informed the people of Owosso about the assassination of President Abraham Lincoln in 1865. In 1867, Turner was elected a member of the Michigan Constitutional Convention. Turner was appointed the United States Consul at Amherstburg, Ontario, Canada. Turner on died April 7, 1907, in Owosso, Michigan. Turner was a relative of Wolcott Turner Brooks, a member of the Wisconsin State Assembly.

References

External links
 History of Livingston County, Michigan 1880-biographical sketch of Judge Josiah Turner

People from New Haven, Vermont
People from Howell, Michigan
People from Owosso, Michigan
Vermont lawyers
Michigan lawyers
Michigan state court judges
Justices of the Michigan Supreme Court
Mayors of places in Michigan
Michigan Republicans
American consuls
19th-century American diplomats
1811 births
1907 deaths
19th-century American judges